The Troubleshooters is an American adventure television series about a construction team that takes on difficult jobs around the world. It stars Keenan Wynn and Bob Mathias and aired on NBC during the 1959–1960 television season.

Synopsis
Kodiak is a construction engineer who for five years has served as the chief troubleshooter for the Stenrud Corporation, a heavy construction firm. The work has taken him throughout the United States and around the world to solve difficult problems that crop up in construction projects ranging from highways to dams to skyscrapers to airports to nuclear facilities. The pace of the work has begun to wear on him, and he has begun a slow program of training his assistant, construction engineer Frank Dugan, to replace him eventually. The two men are very different: Kodiak is an older, grizzled, gruff, and brawny veteran of construction work, while Dugan is young, more socially adept, well-educated, soft-spoken, and innocent. As they travel around the United States and the world to troubleshoot problems on construction sites, they learn from one another: Kodiak becomes more civil and Dugan gets stronger and more assertive. Scotty, Skinner, Jim, and Slats are members of their construction crew who frequently work with them on their projects.

Cast
 Keenan Wynn as Kodiak
 Bob Mathias as Frank Dugan
 Robert Fortier as Scotty
 Carey Loftin as Skinner
 Bob Harris as Jim
 Chet Allen as Slats

Production

The Troubleshooters was a Meridian Productions-United Artists Television production, the first network television show produced by United Artists. Frank P. Rosenberg and John Gibbs produced the series, and Robert Altman was among its episode directors.

Broadcast history

The Troubleshooters premiered on September 11, 1959, and 26 episodes were produced. It aired on NBC on Fridays at 8:00 p.m. Eastern Time. The show was cancelled after a single season, and its last new episode was broadcast on April 1, 1960. Prime-time reruns of The Troubleshooters then aired in its regular time slot until June 17, 1960.

Episodes
SOURCE

References

External links
 

American adventure television series
1959 American television series debuts
1960 American television series endings
Black-and-white American television shows
NBC original programming
Television shows set in the United States
English-language television shows